Uguana is a village in the Punjab province of Pakistan.

References

Villages in Punjab, Pakistan